The Salmon Run Mall is a shopping center located in Watertown, New York. The mall currently features anchor stores Regal Cinemas, Dick's Sporting Goods, Burlington, JCPenney, Hobby Lobby, Christmas Tree Shops, and Best Buy. It also features notable brands American Eagle, Hollister, Charlotte Russe and Victoria's Secret.

History 
One of the original anchor stores was a branch for regional Chappell's, which closed in 1993 when the chain entered bankruptcy. It was remodeled that same year and became The Bon-Ton.

Another anchor store that built on in mid-1990's was Montgomery Ward, which closed and converted to Burlington in 2001.

On January 31, 2018, it was announced that regional division Bon-Ton would shutter as part of bankruptcy. Potential replacement tenants have been rumored in discussion since 2019.

In 2019, it was announced Hobby Lobby would replace Sears. The store opened in 2020.

On May 19, 2021, the Twitter account for the mall posted a tweet claiming to have a playable demo of Splatoon 3. Due to the similarity between the malls name and a gamemode in Splatoon 2 called "Salmon Run", the Tweet gained moderate attention. The tweet was later deleted.

Layout 
The mall currently features anchor stores Regal Cinemas, Dick's Sporting Goods, Burlington, JCPenney, Hobby Lobby, Christmas Tree Shops, and Best Buy. It also features notable brands American Eagle, Hollister, Charlotte Russe and Victoria's Secret.

References

The Pyramid Companies
Shopping malls in New York (state)
Shopping malls established in 1986
Buildings and structures in Watertown, New York
1986 establishments in New York (state)